Stuart Laing is a British actor.

Career

TV and Film 
Laing started his TV career with roles in Casualty (TV series), The Bill and Minder (TV series) in 1993. In 1994, Laing played a lead role in the two part BBC drama, Blood and Peaches. That same year, he appeared in his first feature film, 3 Steps to Heaven for Channel 4. Additionally, in 1995 Laing played the role of Lena Headey's Italian boyfriend in Devil's Advocate. 

In 1995, Laing played one of the leads in the TV drama Strike Force, a show about RAF tornado pilots.

In 1996, Laing played the part of another pilot in the World War II feature Gaston's War, opposite Olivia Williams playing the character Harry.

Other notable TV roles in the late 1990s include two 10-part series: Berkeley Square as the character Jack Wickham and the BBC drama, In a Land of Plenty, as the character Robert.

Laing also appeared in the late 1990s in two Simon Rumley feature films, Strong Language and The Truth Game. In 2001, Laing played one of the leads in the film South West 9. In 2002, he played the role of David in the film The Lawless Heart and the lead role in the 2002 film Butterfly Man. In 2003, Laing played Jack Hewitt in the four part BBC series Cambridge Spies. 

TV roles followed in 2003–2005, playing an assassin in Spooks, a semi regular in Holby City, and the BBC series Burn It. Laing also played a guest role in the Ray Winstone drama Vincent, Poirot, the TV drama Every Time you Look at Me, Francis Tuesday and Keeley Hawes's boyfriend in the date rape drama Sex & Lies. 

Also in 2005, Laing appeared in The Inspector Lynley Mysteries and played the lead role in the Channel 4 drama The Animator. Laing played the guest lead in a one hour live episode of The Bill, playing a war veteran who takes hostages.

In 2006, Laing became a regular on BBC's EastEnders, playing over 86 episodes as Rob Minter, caught in a love triangle between May and Dawn.

Other TV roles have included Trial & Retribution, Silent Witness, How TV Ruined Your Life, Emmerdale and in 2019, Laing played a traumatised father who kills his stepson in the ITV Studios drama Vera.

Theatre 
In 1993, Laing made his professional theatre debut in Joe Orton's Loot at the Thorndike Theatre. This was followed by the play Salt Lake Psycho and Bad Company at the Bush Theatre. Laing then appeared in two plays at the Leicester Haymarket Theatre, Over Hear and Kiss of the Spiderwoman, playing the role of Molina.

In 1998, Laing performed six short plays at the Soho Theatre called Food for Thought. This was the first of several plays at the Soho Theatre, the most recent being Hundreds and Thousands in 2011.

In 1999, he played opposite Andrew Lincoln in Hushabye Mountain at Hampstead Theatre. Other theatre roles followed in Indian Country at Chapter Arts Centre, Streetcar Named Desire at Theatr Clwyd, Seasons Greetings at Liverpool Playhouse and another Alan Ayckbourn play Drowning on Dry Land at Salisbury Playhouse.

In the West End of London, in 2008 Laing performed in the three hander Blowing Whistles at Leicester Square Theatre, followed by the premier of a Neil LaBute trilogy of plays that went on tour in the UK. 

In 2014, Laing played the title role in Macbeth at the Mercury Theatre, Colchester.

In 2015, on tour in the UK, Laing played the role of Ed Boone in the Royal National Theatre's Olivier and Tony Award winning production of The Curious Incident of the Dog in the Night-Time (play). Laing played the role again for five months at the Piccadilly Theatre in 2019, after having also performed the play in China and Australia.

Additionally in 2019, Laing performed in another production of Macbeth at Chichester Festival Theatre, this time playing Banquo to John Simm's Macbeth.

Filmography

References

External links
 

English male soap opera actors
Living people
20th-century male actors from Northern Ireland
21st-century male actors from Northern Ireland
English male film actors
Year of birth missing (living people)